Wake Up World is the debut album by Finnish pop singer Isac Elliot. It was produced by Joonas Angeria and released on 24 May 2013. In its first week of release, the album peaked at number one on the Finnish Album Chart.

Singles
Two singles with accompanying music videos were released; "New Way Home", released on 14 February 2013, peaked at number one on the Finnish Singles Chart. The second single "First Kiss" was released on 31 May 2013.

Track listing

Charts and certifications

Charts

Certifications

Release history

References

2013 debut albums
Isac Elliot albums
Sony Music albums